The Asian–African Legal Consultative Organization (AALCO) is an international governmental organization formed in 1956, initially to serve as an advisory board to member states on matters on international law. It was an outgrowth of the Bandung Conference, held in Indonesia during April, 1955, which led to the establishment of the Asian Legal Consultative Committee (ALCC). In April, 1958, it changed its name to the Asian-African Legal Consultative Committee (AALCC) to reflect the growth of its membership beyond the African side of the United Arab Republic. Since 2001, it has been known by its current name, the AALCO, reflecting the growth of its international status; currently an intergovernmental organization having received a standing United Nations invitation to participate as an observer in the sessions and the work of the General Assembly and maintaining a permanent office at Headquarters.

In 2014, the AALCO established an Informal Expert Group on Customary International Law. That group adopted a set of comments on the work of the International Law Commission on identification of customary international law. Those comments and the report of the AALCO Special Rapporteur Sienho Yee are published on the website of the AALCO.

AALCO Regional Centres for International Commercial Arbitration 

One of the major achievements of AALCO in its programme in the economic field was the launching of its Integrated Scheme for Settlement of Disputes in the Economic and Commercial Transactions in 1978. Pursuant to that Scheme, it was decided to establish Regional Arbitration Centres under the auspices of AALCO, which would function as international institutions with the objectives to promote international commercial arbitration in the Asian-African regions and provide for conducting international arbitrations under these Centres.
Five such Centres have been established so far, as below:

Asian International Arbitration Centre (AIAC, formerly known as Kuala Lumpur Regional Centre for Arbitration), Malaysia
Cairo Regional Centre for International Commercial Arbitration (CRCICA), Arab Republic of Egypt
Regional Centre for International Commercial Arbitration Lagos (RCICAL), Nigeria
Tehran Regional Arbitration Centre (TRAC), Islamic Republic of Iran
Nairobi Centre for International Arbitration (NCIA), Nairobi, Republic of Kenya 

The respective host Governments recognize their independent status like an international organization and have accorded privileges and immunities to these Centres.
AALCO provides its expertise and assistance to its Member States in the appointment of arbitrators and other matters related to the conduct of arbitration. Its Centers provide the opportunities for training of arbitrators as well. The Directors of the Centres, who are from amongst lawyers familiar to arbitration, are appointed by suggestion of the host governments and ratification of the Secretary-General of AALCO. Directors of the Centres present their reports on the functioning of the Centres at the Annual Sessions of AALCO.

List of AALCO Secretaries-General

Barry Sen (1956–1987)
Frank X. Njenga (1988–1994)
Chengyuan (1994–2000)
Wafik Zaher Kamil (2000–2008)
Rahmat Mohamad (2008–2016)
Kennedy Gastorn (2016–2020)
Kamalinne Pinitpuvadol (2021–present)

Members 

The current membership includes the following members, with founding members marked with an asterisk (*):

 

* (founding member as United Arab Republic)

*
*
*

*

*

 

*

* (founding member as United Arab Republic)

References

External links

International law organizations
Intergovernmental organizations
Organisations based in Delhi
Organizations established in 1956
United Nations General Assembly observers
Third-Worldism
1956 establishments in Asia